The Simard Lake is a freshwater body located in the northwestern part of Gouin Reservoir, in the territory of the town of La Tuque, in the administrative region of Mauricie, in the province of Quebec, in Canada.

This lake extends in the townships of Lacasse (northern part of the lake) and Crémazie (southern part of the lake).

Recreotourism activities are the main economic activity of the sector. Forestry comes second. Recreational boating is particularly popular on this water, especially for sport fishing.

The Lake Simard hydrographic slope is served on the side by secondary forest roads connected to the R2046 and R1045 forest roads that connect the village of
Obedjiwan, Quebec.

The surface of Lake Simard is usually frozen from mid-November to the end of April, however, safe ice circulation is generally from early December to the end of March.

Water management at the Gouin Dam can lead to significant variations in the water level, particularly at the end of the winter when the water is lowered.

Geography

Toponymy
The term "Simard" is a family name of French origin.

The French toponym "Simard Lake" was formalized on December 5, 1968, by the Commission de toponymie du Québec, i.e. at the creation of this Commission.

Notes and references

See also 

Lakes of Mauricie
La Tuque, Quebec